Cameron Island is a small island just north of Hailstorm Island, in the Swain Islands, Antarctica. This region was photographed from the air by U.S. Navy Operation Highjump (1946–47), ANARE (Australian National Antarctic Research Expeditions) (1956), and the Soviet expedition (1956). The island was included in a 1957 ground survey by C.R. Eklund, who named it for Richard L. Cameron, chief glaciologist at Wilkes Station, 1957.

Important Bird Area
The island, along with neighbouring Berkley Island, the intervening sea and smaller islets, has been identified as  a 97 ha Important Bird Area by BirdLife International because it supports some 14,000 pairs of breeding Adélie penguins (as estimated from January 2011 satellite imagery). It lies about 9 km east of Australia's Casey Station.

See also 
 List of Antarctic and sub-Antarctic islands
 Magee Rock

References

External links

 
Important Bird Areas of Antarctica
Penguin colonies
Windmill Islands